Amenemopet was an ancient Egyptian prince during the 18th Dynasty, probably a son of Amenhotep II.

He is known from the so-called Stela C, found in the Sphinx temple of Amenhotep II. He is identified as a son of this pharaoh based on the stela, which is stylistically datable to the reign of Amenhotep II. It is possible that he is the Prince Amenemopet shown on the stela of the royal nurse Senetruiu.

References

Princes of the Eighteenth Dynasty of Egypt
Children of Amenhotep II